András Gyárfás (born 1945) is a Hungarian mathematician who specializes in the study of graph theory. He is famous for two conjectures: 

 Together with Paul Erdős he conjectured what is now called the Erdős–Gyárfás conjecture which states that any graph with minimum degree 3 contains a simple cycle whose length is a power of two. 
 He and David Sumner independently formulated the Gyárfás–Sumner conjecture according to which, for every tree T, the T-free graphs are χ-bounded.

Gyárfás began working as a researcher for the Computer and Automation Research Institute of the Hungarian Academy of Sciences in 1968. He earned a candidate degree in 1980, and a doctorate (Dr. Math. Sci.) in 1992. He won the Géza Grünwald Commemorative Prize for young researchers of the János Bolyai Mathematical Society in 1978. He was co-author with Paul Erdős on  15 papers, and thus has Erdős number one.

References

External links
 András Gyárfás at the Computer and Automation Research Institute, Hungarian Academy of Sciences
Google scholar profile

20th-century Hungarian mathematicians
21st-century Hungarian mathematicians
1945 births
Combinatorialists
Living people